Yahballah V may refer to:

 Yahballaha III, Patriarch of the Church of the East 1281–1317
 Yahballaha IV, Chaldean Catholic Patriarch of Babylon 1572–1580

See also
List of patriarchs of the Church of the East
List of Chaldean Catholic patriarchs of Babylon